Opsodoras stuebelii, the Maranon thorn catfish, is a species of thorny catfish from the family Doradidae which is found in the Amazon Basin in Bolivia, Brazil, Colombia, Ecuador and Peru. It is the type species of the genus Opsodoras.

References

Doradidae
Fish of Bolivia
Freshwater fish of Brazil
Freshwater fish of Colombia
Freshwater fish of Ecuador
Freshwater fish of Peru
Fish of the Amazon basin
Fish described in 1882